The 2015 NASCAR K&N Pro Series West was the sixty-second season of the K&N Pro Series West. Beginning with the NAPA Auto Parts 150 at Kern County Raceway Park on March 28, the season ended on November 12 with the Casino Arizona 200 at Phoenix International Raceway . Two-time champion Greg Pursley did not defend his series title, as he retired at the end of the 2014 season. Chris Eggleston won the championship, seven points ahead of Noah Gragson.

Drivers

Notes

Schedule

All of the races in the 2015 season will be televised on NBCSN and will be on a tape delay basis.

Notes

Results and standings

Races

Drivers' championship

(key) Bold - Pole position awarded by time. Italics - Pole position set by final practice results or rainout. * – Most laps led.

Notes
1 – Scored points towards the K&N Pro Series East.
2 – Jesse Iwuji received championship points, despite the fact that he did not start the race.
3 – Dylan Caldwell, Jesse Iwuji, Robb Kneeland and Dan O'Donnell received championship points, despite the fact that they withdrew prior to the race.
4 – Johnny Borneman III, Christian Celaya, Bobby Hillis Jr., Bill Kann, Christian McGhee and Colton Nelson received championship points, despite the fact that they did not qualify for the race.

See also

 2015 NASCAR Sprint Cup Series
 2015 NASCAR Xfinity Series
 2015 NASCAR Camping World Truck Series
 2015 ARCA Racing Series
 2015 NASCAR K&N Pro Series East
 2015 NASCAR Whelen Modified Tour
 2015 NASCAR Whelen Southern Modified Tour
 2015 NASCAR Canadian Tire Series
 2015 NASCAR Mexico Series
 2015 NASCAR Whelen Euro Series

References

ARCA Menards Series West